Apna Hi Ghar Samajhiye (Make Yourself at Home) was a BBC television and radio programme, presented in Hindustani, with the aim of helping immigrants from South Asia to the United Kingdom to become integrated.

The programme was announced on 4 October 1965.

Television programme
The first episode was broadcast at 9am on Sunday 10 October 1965 as "In Logon Se Miliye" meaning "Let Me Introduce You". In January 1966 this was altered to Apna Hi Ghar Samajhiye meaning "Make Yourself at Home". In 1966 it was presented by Mahendra Kaul, with Saleem Shahed. The theme song was composed and sung by Pandit Shiv Dayal Batish. In November 1968 there was another title change to Nai Zindagi Naya Jeevan, meaning "New Way, New Life". This was then replaced in June 1982 with Asian Magazine which ran until April 1987 which, along with companion programme Gharbar, ended ahead of the launch of a new single Saturday afternoon programme Network East in July 1987.

Radio programme
The first episode was broadcast on the same day on the BBC Home Service. It continued to be broadcast on BBC Radio 4 until 28 December 1986 and throughout its 20 years on air it was called Apna Hi Ghar Samajhiye.

References

BBC Television shows
Immigration to the United Kingdom
Indian diaspora in the United Kingdom
Pakistani diaspora in the United Kingdom
British Indian mass media
British Pakistani mass media